The 2006 Pocono 500 was a NASCAR Nextel Cup Series race that was held on June 11, 2006 at Pocono Raceway in Long Pond, Pennsylvania. It was the fourteenth race of the 2006 NASCAR Sprint Cup Series season. Denny Hamlin of Joe Gibbs Racing won the race. It was Hamlin's first career Nextel Cup Series win.

Failed to qualify: Scott Wimmer (#4), Derrike Cope (#74), Stanton Barrett (#95), Greg Sacks (#34), Brent Sherman (#72)

Qualifying

Results

References

Pocono 500
Pocono 500
NASCAR races at Pocono Raceway
June 2006 sports events in the United States